Pingdingshan University, founded in 1977, is in Pingdingshan City, Henan Province, China.

Academics
The university includes the School of Chinese Language; the School of Foreign Languages; Math and Information Science College; Economics and Management College; School of Chemistry Art; College of Information Science and Technology; Teachers' College; Political Science Department; Environment and Geography Department; Physical Education Department; and Music and Arts Department.

Besides these, the school offers a Department of English for General Teaching, Adult Education College, Politics Education Department and an Education Artificial Department.

External links
 

Universities and colleges in Henan
Educational institutions established in 1977
1977 establishments in China
Pingdingshan